Twitching Tongues is an American metal band from California, founded in 2009 by brothers Colin and Taylor Young. The band has released four full-length albums: Sleep Therapy in 2012, In Love There Is No Law in 2013, Disharmony in 2015, and Gaining Purpose Through Passionate Hatred in 2018. They have also released two EPs – 2011's I & I (Insane and Inhumane) and 2012's Preacher Man. Twitching Tongues has toured internationally in the past, alongside other metal bands such as Harm's Way.

Their 2015 album, Disharmony, was positively reviewed by NPR's Lars Gotrich, who wrote that Twitching Tongues has "been particularly adept at the moody mosh." The album also received a favorable reception from Vice's John Hill, who opined that "hardcore is at its best when it takes risks", using the band's song "Asylum Avenue" as an example. In a 2018 Revolver interview, frontman Colin Young said that Peter Steele had been a formative influence on his music and the band's work.

Members 
Current
Colin Young – vocals (2009–present)
Taylor Young – guitar, vocals (2009–present)
Sean Martin – guitar (2015–present)
Alec Faber – bass (2016–present)
Cayle Sain – drums (2015–present)

Former
Anthonie Gonzalez – bass (2015–2016)
Lee Orozco – guitar (2012–2015)
Kyle Thomas – bass (2012–2015)
Michael Cesario – drums (2009–2015)
Keith Paull – bass (2009–2012)

Discography

Studio albums 
Sleep Therapy (2012, I Scream)
In Love There Is No Law (2013, Closed Casket Activities)
Disharmony (2015, Metal Blade)
Gaining Purpose Through Passionate Hatred (2018, Metal Blade)

EPs 
I & I (Insane and Inhumane) (2011, Photobooth Records)
Preacher Man (2012, Closed Casket Activities)
Disharmony Zero (2018, Metal Blade)

References

External links

Twitching Tongues at Metal Blade Records

Hardcore punk groups from California
Musical groups established in 2009
Musical groups from California